Mahesh Iranagouda Kumathalli is an Indian politician. He was elected to the Karnataka Legislative Assembly from Athani in the 2018 Karnataka Legislative Assembly election as a member of the Indian National Congress and in 2019 by election as a member of BJP.

References

1962 births
Living people
Bharatiya Janata Party politicians from Karnataka
Indian National Congress politicians from Karnataka
People from Belgaum
Karnataka MLAs 2018–2023